Shunno (English: Zero) is a Bangladeshi Pop rock band formed in 2007 in Dhaka by Imrul Karim Emil & Shaker Raza. They are one of the most popular bands of Bangladesh.

History

Formation and establishment 
Vocalist Imrul Karim Emil and lead guitarist Shaker Raza formed Shunno in 2007. A few days later, bassist Andrew Michael Gomez and drummer Rafatul Bari Labib joined them. In 2016, Ishmamul Farhad joined the band as lead guitarist, replacing Shaker Raza.

In 2007, they began their journey with the song called Prottasha of Fuad al Muqtadir's Bonno album. In 2008, a song titled Shopnoghuri was released on the mixed album Rang.

In 2008, they released their debut album Notun Srot.

In 2009, Shunno's second album Shoto Asha was released. The song Shoto Asha from this album became very popular and Grameenphone used the song as the theme song for the 2011 Cricket World Cup.

Gorbo Bangladesh, their third album was released by Shunno in 2011. In 2012, Dhaka Gladiators team theme song was also sung by Shunno.

Their fourth album Bhaago was released in 2014. In the 2015 Cricket World Cup, they also sang the song Cholo Bangladesh. They also sang a song titled Deshpremiker Gaan produced by Robi.

The last time their fifth album Lottery was released was in 2017. To encourage the Bangladesh National Cricket Team for their upcoming 2019 Cricket World Cup, they also sang the song Cholbe Lorai.

On 1 January 2021, Shunno released a song called Bibiya with Brishty Dessa writing its lyrics. Bibiya is a story of the south and is a lullaby of a fisherman who is putting off his daughter to sleep before he heads off for his work to the ever so unpredictable sea.

On 20 March 2021, Shunno's latest song Behula was released with Tanvir Chowdhury writing its lyrics and was a big hit. Behula is a story of the north and the song represents the mythical story of Behula and is based on Shiva Purana and the Manasamangal genre of Bengali medieval epics. The song had the first animated music video which portrayed instincts of a legendary myth and a video game.

Concerts

Joy Bangla Concert 
Shunno performed many concerts and shows in Bangladesh and abroad. They performed maximum shows at Joy Bangla Concert which is the most popular concert in the country from 2015 till now.

Discography

Studio albums

নতুন স্রোত (The New Wave) (2008)

শত আশা (Hundreds of Hopes) (2009)

গড়বো বাংলাদেশ (Building Bangladesh) (2011)

ভাগো (Run) (2014)

Lottery (2017)

Singles 
 বিবিয়া (Wife) (2021)
 বেহুলা (Lover) (2021)

Awards 
 Meril Prothom Alo Awards - Best Band of the Year (2008)
 Citycell-Channel I Music Awards (2009)
 Citycell-Channel I Music Awards (2011)

Members 
Present members
 Imrul Karim Emil — vocals, guitars 
 Andrew Michael Gomes – bass guitars 
 Rafatul Bari Labib - drums 
 Ishmamul Farhad - lead guitars 

Past members
 Shaker Raza — lead guitars

See also 
 Rock music of Bangladesh

References

External links 
 
 

Bengali music
Bangladeshi rock music groups
Bangladeshi alternative rock groups
Bangladeshi pop rock music groups
Musical groups established in 2007
2007 establishments in Bangladesh